Te Papapa is a suburb of Auckland, New Zealand. It is located nine kilometres to the southeast of Auckland city centre, on the northern shore of Māngere Inlet, an arm of the Manukau Harbour. The residential and light-industrial suburb lies between the suburbs of Onehunga, Penrose, and Southdown, and is at the northern end of the Māngere Bridge which connects it with the South Auckland suburb of Māngere. Train services on the Onehunga Line run through the suburb on the Onehunga Branch line, which reopened in 2010. Services at Te Papapa station commenced on 19 September 2010. Carter Holt Harvey's head office is located at 173 Captain Springs Road in the Te Papapa area. It has been suggested that the name of the suburb refers to a fortress built of rock slabs. However, at the time Te Papapa Railway Station first opened the area around was commonly known as "Pumpkin Flat" and a short article in the Auckland Star reported that the general manager of the railways had chosen to name the station after the "Maori long pumpkin or Te Papapa" in remembrance of the commonly used name.

Demographics

Te Papapa had a population of 3,237 at the 2018 New Zealand census, an increase of 177 people (5.8%) since the 2013 census, and an increase of 360 people (12.5%) since the 2006 census. There were 1,128 households, comprising 1,572 males and 1,668 females, giving a sex ratio of 0.94 males per female. The median age was 34.2 years (compared with 37.4 years nationally), with 672 people (20.8%) aged under 15 years, 648 (20.0%) aged 15 to 29, 1,650 (51.0%) aged 30 to 64, and 264 (8.2%) aged 65 or older.

Ethnicities were 53.5% European/Pākehā, 12.2% Māori, 25.2% Pacific peoples, 20.9% Asian, and 3.5% other ethnicities. People may identify with more than one ethnicity.

The percentage of people born overseas was 35.3, compared with 27.1% nationally.

Although some people chose not to answer the census's question about religious affiliation, 40.1% had no religion, 43.9% were Christian, 1.0% had Māori religious beliefs, 3.2% were Hindu, 2.7% were Muslim, 1.0% were Buddhist and 1.6% had other religions.

Of those at least 15 years old, 858 (33.5%) people had a bachelor's or higher degree, and 366 (14.3%) people had no formal qualifications. The median income was $42,800, compared with $31,800 nationally. 657 people (25.6%) earned over $70,000 compared to 17.2% nationally. The employment status of those at least 15 was that 1,518 (59.2%) people were employed full-time, 261 (10.2%) were part-time, and 111 (4.3%) were unemployed.

Education

References

External links
Photographs of Te Papapa held in Auckland Libraries' heritage collections.

Suburbs of Auckland